Little Egg Harbor Township is a township in Ocean County, in the U.S. state of New Jersey. As of the 2020 United States census, the township's population was 20,784, an increase of 719 (+3.6%) from the 2010 census count of 20,065, which in turn reflected an increase of 4,120 (+25.8%) from the 15,945 counted in the 2000 census. The 2010 population was the highest recorded in any decennial census.

History

Founding

Originally part of Burlington County, Little Egg Harbor took its name from the portion of a bay called Egg Harbor (known today as Little Egg Harbor) by the Dutch sailors because of the eggs found in nearby gull nests. The first known account of the town was made by Captain Cornelius Jacobsen May in 1614.

The first European to settle the township was Hendrick Jacobs Falkenberg, who likely arrived by 1693 when he does not appear on a census of the Swedes along the Delaware River, where he had lived for nearly three decades. Though he was from Holstein (now in Germany), his first wife was a Finn and part of the Swedish community. Falkenberg settled on an  tract of land that he had acquired from the Lenni Lenape Native Americans in 1674, and a 1697 deed re-confirmed this earlier purchase. This tract included the two islands of Monhunk and Minnicunk later known as Osborn Island and Wills Island.  Falkenberg was a linguist, fluent in the Lenape language, and was considered southern New Jersey's foremost language interpreter involving land transactions between the Indians and the European settlers, particularly the English Quakers.

The Little Egg Harbor Massacre took place in October 1778 during the American Revolutionary War, as British Army Major Patrick Ferguson was wreaking havoc on Colonial shipping in the Mullica River. Kazimierz Pułaski and his newly raised forces were ordered to oppose his actions. Pulaski's Legion, along with three companies of light infantry, three troops of light horse, and one artillery detachment, came too late to be of great use against Ferguson's operations. But their arrival did stop Ferguson from raiding the iron works at Batsto, and stemmed their attacks on privateers at The Forks of the Mullica River.

They then set up camp on a farm. A deserter, Lt. Gustav Juliet, found Ferguson and told him of Pulaski's encampment; he mentioned that morale was fairly low, and security almost nonexistent, so that a surprise attack would be devastating. He then marched them a further  to the site of the infantry outpost, which comprised 50 men a short distance from the main encampment. At first light, Ferguson ordered the attack; only five of his quarry were taken alive. Pulaski eventually led his mounted troops up, causing Ferguson to retreat to his boats minus a few men that had fallen into the colonists' hands. A memorial on Radio Road commemorates the attack.

Little Egg Harbor Township was formed on February 13, 1740, as Egg Harbour Township from portions of Northampton Township (now Mount Holly), while the area was still part of Burlington County. It was incorporated as one of New Jersey's 104 in the Township Act of 1798 by an act of the New Jersey Legislature on February 21, 1798. While in Burlington County, portions of the township were taken to form Washington Township (November 19, 1802) and Bass River Township (March 30, 1864). Little Egg Harbor Township became part of Ocean County on March 30, 1891, after which further portions of the township were ceded to create Long Beach Township (March 23, 1899) and Tuckerton (February 18, 1901).

Tuckerton Wireless Tower

The tower was used to communicate with an identical radio telegraph station in Eilvese, Germany starting on Jun 19, 1914, less than two weeks before the assassination of Archduke Ferdinand. The station continued to communicate with Eilvese  until America entered World War I on April 6, 1917. It is rumored that it was used to send the message to order the attack by a German U-boat on the RMS Lusitania. After President Wilson's Declaration of Neutrality, the President's Executive Order 2042 required the US Navy to take over the station on September 9, 1914, to assure the neutrality of messages sent to and from the station. However, the station continued to be operated by German nationals employed by HOMAG and continued to communicate only with the Eilvese radio station.

When America entered the war, all U.S. radio stations were seized and shut down by Executive Order 2605A on April 30, 1917. The remaining German personnel at Tuckerton immediately became war prisoners and were replaced by U.S. Navy personnel.  The Navy used the  Tuckerton Radio Station for transatlantic communications while the naval radio stations in New Brunswick, New Jersey and Sayville, New York were undergoing major transmitter and antenna upgrades.  Tuckerton was used for fleet broadcasts after installations of 200 kilowatt transmitters at New Brunswick and Sayville were completed in June 1918.

After the war, the Tuckerton Wireless Station was included in German war reparations paid to America. Shortly afterwards, it was sold to RCA which operated it until 1948 as a backup to their famous Radio Central facility in Rocky Point, New York. In 1921, RCA installed two massive Alexanderson alternators, which were removed in 1948.  For transatlantic communications, the radio station operated under the call signs WCI and WGG. For coastal communications, after World War I,  the station operated under the callsign WSC. The  steel tower, anchored by three large concrete blocks, was taken down on December 27, 1955. The three huge anchor blocks still exist today, in a backyard on North Ensign Drive and in the middle of South Ensign Drive and Staysail Drive. Many smaller anchor blocks providing foundations for smaller towers that supported the umbrella antenna are still visible in the lagoons. Remains of the large tower can be seen in scraps at the Giffordtown Museum.

Later history
While the township was formed in the 1700s, Little Egg Harbor remained predominantly rural and undeveloped well into the late 20th century. It wasn't until the late 1950s until any major development was started. During this time, the construction of manufactured waterfront bungalows on lagoons were built and marketed as vacation properties, most notably Mystic Islands, Holly Lake Harbor, as well as Atlantis; the latter of which a "research home" was constructed to test hundreds of components and finishing materials for possible inclusion in model homes. Most of the population were seasonal residents from either New York, Philadelphia, or other parts of New Jersey. Several developments were constructed in the decades following around the Mystic Islands area, mostly consisting of townhomes, duplex, and small single-family homes meant to act as either vacation homes or year-round residence.

In 1979, Pinelands Regional High School opened in the growing township, serving students from Little Egg Harbor, Tuckerton, Bass River, and Eagleswood; those students formerly went to Southern Regional High School in Manahawkin.

By the 2000s, the township was one of the fastest-growing in Ocean County, next to Barnegat. The formerly sleepy township saw the development of several new housing developments, shopping centers, and offices. While 75% of the growth came from new retirement communities, the former resort town dubbed "Little Treasure on the Bay" saw an influx of year-round residents and families, becoming more of a suburb.

On November 3, 2004, a fighter jet on a training mission from the 113th Wing of the District of Columbia Air National Guard, based at Andrews Air Force Base in Maryland, shot seven bullets into the roof of the Little Egg Harbor Intermediate School, and many others into the parking lot. Only a few custodians were in the school, and nobody was injured. The school was repaired during the New Jersey Teachers' Convention, using $519,000 paid by the Air Force to the school district.

On the morning of August 28, 2011, Tropical Storm Irene made its second U.S. landfall in Brigantine, though initial reports placed it at the Little Egg Inlet on the border with Galloway Township. At the time it was believed to be the first hurricane to make landfall in New Jersey since 1903, but later analysis by the National Hurricane Center determined that the storm had weakened to tropical storm status by the time it made its second landfall. On October 29, 2012, Hurricane Sandy caused widespread damage and flooding to the township, damaging roughly 4,000 homes, especially in the Mystic Island section. On the one-year anniversary of the storm, New Jersey Governor Chris Christie visited the township's Community Center to celebrate both the reopening of the storm-damaged building as well as the recovery efforts from the storm.

Geography
According to the United States Census Bureau, the township had a total area of 72.97 square miles (188.99 km2), including 47.35 square miles (122.63 km2) of land and 25.62 square miles (66.36 km2) of water (35.11%).

Mystic Island (2010 Census population of 8,493) is an unincorporated community and census-designated place (CDP) located in the southern part of the township.

Other unincorporated communities, localities and place names located partially or completely within the township include Atlantis, Edge Cove, Giffordtown, Jessies Point, Nugentown, Parkertown, Storm Island, Tucker Beach and West Tuckerton.

The township borders the Ocean County municipalities of Barnegat Township, Beach Haven, Eagleswood Township, Long Beach Township and Stafford Township; Galloway Township in Atlantic County; and both Bass River Township and Woodland Township in Burlington County. Little Egg Harbor completely surrounds the independent municipality of Tuckerton, which became independent when it was incorporated in 1901. Little Egg Harbor and Tuckerton share the same ZIP code.

Demographics

2010 census

The Census Bureau's 2006–2010 American Community Survey showed that (in 2010 inflation-adjusted dollars) median household income was $59,365 (with a margin of error of +/− $3,765) and the median family income was $66,345 (+/− $4,466). Males had a median income of $56,279 (+/− $3,204) versus $42,683 (+/− $3,850) for females. The per capita income for the borough was $28,566 (+/− $1,778). About 6.5% of families and 8.9% of the population were below the poverty line, including 14.9% of those under age 18 and 4.7% of those age 65 or over.

2000 census
As of the 2000 United States census there were 15,945 people, 6,179 households, and 4,442 families residing in the township. The racial makeup of the township was 96.22% White, 0.79% African American, 0.26% Native American, 0.60% Asian, 0.01% Pacific Islander, 0.98% from other races, and 1.15% from two or more races. Hispanic or Latino of any race were 3.26% of the population.

There were 6,179 households, out of which 30.3% had children under the age of 18 living with them, 56.8% were married couples living together, 10.4% had a female householder with no husband present, and 28.1% were non-families. 22.5% of all households were made up of individuals, and 10.7% had someone living alone who was 65 years of age or older. The average household size was 2.55 and the average family size was 2.98.

In the township the population was spread out, with 24.2% under the age of 18, 6.7% from 18 to 24, 27.5% from 25 to 44, 23.9% from 45 to 64, and 17.7% who were 65 years of age or older. The median age was 40 years. For every 100 females, there were 92.3 males.  For every 100 females age 18 and over, there were 89.8 males.

The median income for a household in the township was $45,628, and the median income for a family was $51,580. Males had a median income of $39,668 versus $29,576 for females. The per capita income for the township was $20,619. About 4.1% of families and 6.5% of the population were below the poverty line, including 9.4% of those under age 18 and 3.4% of those age 65 or over.

Government

Local government 
Little Egg Harbor operates under the Township form of New Jersey municipal government, one of 141 municipalities (of the 564) statewide that use this form, the second-most commonly used form of government in the state. The Township Committee is comprised of five members, who are elected directly by the voters at-large in partisan elections to serve three-year terms of office on a staggered basis, with either one or two seats coming up for election each year as part of the November general election in a three-year cycle. Annually, the Township Committee selects one of its members to serve as Mayor, and another as Deputy Mayor, each serving one-year terms.

, the members of the Township Committee are Mayor Blaise Scibetta (R, term on committee ends December 31, 2024; term as mayor ends 2023), Deputy Mayor Dan Maxwell (R, term on committee ends 2024; term as deputy mayor ends 2023), Ray Gormley (R, 2023), John Kehm Jr. (R, 2023) and Kenneth W. Laney Jr. (R, 2025).

In January 2022, the Township Committee appointed Kenneth Laney Jr. to fill the seat expiring in December 2022 that had been held by Barbara Jo Crea until she stepped down from office to take a seat on the Ocean County Board of County Commissioners.

Emergency services
Little Egg Harbor Township is served by Great Bay Regional Volunteer EMS, which also provides primary 911 emergency medical services for the residents of Bass River Township and Eagleswood Township.

Federal, state and county representation 
Little Egg Harbor Township is located in the 2nd Congressional District and is part of New Jersey's 9th state legislative district.

 

Ocean County is governed by a Board of County Commissioners comprised of five members who are elected on an at-large basis in partisan elections and serving staggered three-year terms of office, with either one or two seats coming up for election each year as part of the November general election. At an annual reorganization held in the beginning of January, the board chooses a Director and a Deputy Director from among its members. , Ocean County's Commissioners (with party affiliation, term-end year and residence) are:

Commissioner Director John P. Kelly (R, 2022, Eagleswood Township),
Commissioner Deputy Director Virginia E. Haines (R, 2022, Toms River),
Barbara Jo Crea (R, 2024, Little Egg Harbor Township)
Gary Quinn (R, 2024, Lacey Township) and
Joseph H. Vicari (R, 2023, Toms River). Constitutional officers elected on a countywide basis are 
County Clerk Scott M. Colabella (R, 2025, Barnegat Light),
Sheriff Michael G. Mastronardy (R, 2022; Toms River) and
Surrogate Jeffrey Moran (R, 2023, Beachwood).

Politics
As of March 2011, there were a total of 13,562 registered voters in Little Egg Harbor Township, of which 2,641 (19.5%) were registered as Democrats, 3,963 (29.2%) were registered as Republicans and 6,951 (51.3%) were registered as Unaffiliated. There were 7 voters registered as Libertarians or Greens. Among the township's 2010 Census population, 67.6% (vs. 63.2% in Ocean County) were registered to vote, including 84.9% of those ages 18 and over (vs. 82.6% countywide).

In the 2016 presidential election, Republican Donald Trump received 64.97% of the vote (6,700 cast), ahead of Democrat Hillary Clinton with 30.88% (3,184 votes), and other candidates with 4.15% (428 votes), among the 10,417 ballots cast by the township's 14,633 registered voters (105 ballots were spoiled), for a turnout of 71.1%. In the 2012 presidential election, Republican Mitt Romney received 57.0% of the vote (5,129 cast), ahead of Democrat Barack Obama with 42.0% (3,777 votes), and other candidates with 1.1% (97 votes), among the 9,060 ballots cast by the township's 14,200 registered voters (57 ballots were spoiled), for a turnout of 63.8%. In the 2008 presidential election, Republican John McCain received 56.5% of the vote (5,577 cast), ahead of Democrat Barack Obama with 41.6% (4,108 votes) and other candidates with 1.2% (117 votes), among the 9,879 ballots cast by the township's 14,042 registered voters, for a turnout of 70.4%. In the 2004 presidential election, Republican George W. Bush received 58.9% of the vote (5,046 ballots cast), outpolling Democrat John Kerry with 40.0% (3,430 votes) and other candidates with 0.6% (71 votes), among the 8,571 ballots cast by the township's 12,064 registered voters, for a turnout percentage of 71.0.

In the 2013 gubernatorial election, Republican Chris Christie received 74.6% of the vote (4,603 cast), ahead of Democrat Barbara Buono with 23.5% (1,449 votes), and other candidates with 2.0% (122 votes), among the 6,322 ballots cast by the township's 13,898 registered voters (148 ballots were spoiled), for a turnout of 45.5%. In the 2009 gubernatorial election, Republican Chris Christie received 63.0% of the vote (4,198 ballots cast), ahead of  Democrat Jon Corzine with 28.9% (1,926 votes), Independent Chris Daggett with 5.5% (364 votes) and other candidates with 1.4% (91 votes), among the 6,666 ballots cast by the township's 13,690 registered voters, yielding a 48.7% turnout.

Education 
Students in public school for grades pre-kindergarten through sixth grade attend the schools of the Little Egg Harbor Township School District. Students from Bass River Township begin attending the Little Egg Harbor district as part of a sending/receiving relationship, starting in the 2020–21 school year. As of the 2020–21 school year, the district, comprised of three schools, had an enrollment of 1,609 students and 150.0 classroom teachers (on an FTE basis), for a student–teacher ratio of 10.7:1. Schools in the district (with 2020–21 enrollment data from the National Center for Education Statistics.) are 
Robert C. Wood Sr. Early Childhood Center with 249 students in pre-kindergarten, 
George J. Mitchell Elementary School with 577 students in kindergarten through third grade and 
Frog Pond Elementary School with 785 students in  grades 4 to 6.

Public school students in seventh through twelfth grades attend the schools of the Pinelands Regional School District, which also serves students from Bass River Township, Eagleswood Township and Tuckerton Borough. Schools in the district (with 2020–21 enrollment data from the National Center for Education Statistics) are 
Pinelands Regional Junior High School with 526 students in grades 7–8 and 
Pinelands Regional High School with 1,036 students in grades 9–12. The high school district's board of education  is comprised of nine members directly elected by the residents of the constituent municipalities to three-year terms on a staggered basis, with three seats up for election each year. Little Egg Harbor Township is allocated six of the nine seats.

St. Mary Academy near Manahawkin, a K–8 school of the Roman Catholic Diocese of Trenton, is managed by St. Mary Church of Barnegat.  From 1997, until 2019 it operated as All Saints Regional Catholic School and was collectively managed by five churches, including St. Theresa Church in Little Egg Harbor Township. In 2019 St. Mary took entire control of the school, which remained on the same Manahawkin campus, and changed its name. The other churches no longer operate the school but still may send students there.

Transportation

Roads and highways

The Garden State Parkway passes through the township, connecting Bass River Township in Burlington County in the south to Eagleswood Township in the north and includes interchange 58, which is signed for County Route 539 serving Tuckerton / Trenton. County Route 539 and Route 9 are major arteries in the township.

Public transportation
NJ Transit provides bus service between the township and Atlantic City on the 559 route.

Ocean Ride local service is provided on the OC6 Little Egg Harbor – Stafford Township route.

Notable people

People who were born in, residents of, or otherwise closely associated with Little Egg Harbor Township include:
 Gaten Matarazzo (born 2002), star in the Netflix original series Stranger Things
 Lily McBeth (born 1934), transgender substitute teacher at the town's local schools who made national news after she underwent a gender reassignment operation
 James Moody, ( 1744–1809), loyalist soldier who fought for the British during the American Revolutionary War; after the war, Moody retired to Canada so as not to face punishment as a traitor
 Brian E. Rumpf (born 1964), member of the New Jersey General Assembly since 2003, who also served on the Little Egg Harbor Township Committee, serving as the township's mayor from 2000 to 2003

References

External links

Little Egg Harbor Township website
 Pinelands-Pine Barrens photo galleries of native flora fauna and landscapes

 
1740 establishments in New Jersey
Populated places in the Pine Barrens (New Jersey)
Populated places established in 1740
Township form of New Jersey government
Townships in Ocean County, New Jersey